A registration district is, since 1 January 2016, the smallest administrative subdivision for population registration in Sweden, i.e. the civil registration of births, marriages, civil partnerships and deaths, and for the collation of census information.

Geographically, the districts correspond to the parishes of the Church of Sweden of 31 December 1999. About 85% of the old sockens corresponds with the new districts. The civil registration was originally maintained by the Church of Sweden, but since July 1991 it is administered by the Swedish Tax Agency.

The registration district is also used for registration of land ownership by Lantmäteriet, for the reason that owned land was historically named after parish:neighbourhood:number, but in 2000 changed to municipality:neighbourhood:number, which caused confusion with multiple neighbourhood names in the same municipality.

See also 
 Population registration in Sweden
 Swedish Tax Agency
 Statistics Sweden (SCB)
 Parishes of the Church of Sweden

References 

Subdivisions of Sweden